Qareh Poshtelu-e Bala Rural District is in Qareh Poshtelu District of Zanjan County, Zanjan province, Iran. At the National Census of 2006, its population was 13,915 in 3,250 households. There were 11,917 inhabitants in 3,303 households at the following census of 2011. At the most recent census of 2016, the population of the rural district was 5,147 in 1,534 households. The largest of its 30 villages was Meshkin, with 1,264 people.

References 

Zanjan County

Rural Districts of Zanjan Province

Populated places in Zanjan Province

Populated places in Zanjan County